Akhty is a rural locality (selo) and the administrative center of Akhtynsky District of the Republic of Dagestan, Russia, located in the south of the republic at the confluence of the Akhtychay and Samur Rivers,  from Makhachkala. Population:

History
It was founded around the mid-1st millennium BCE. In the 1st century CE, it had the name Turi and was a part of Caucasian Albania. In the first centuries CE, weaving and pottery, as well as metal processing, developed here. After the collapse of Caucasian Albania in the 5th century CE, the area of leks appeared Lakzi feudal state, of which entered Akhty too.

During the Caucasian War of 1817-1864, Akhty was taken by Russian troops in 1839. In the same year, Akhtinskoye fortress was established at this location. In 1848, the fortress played an important role in defense against the attacking Shamil troops. During the Russian Empire, the settlement was the administrative capital of the Samursky Okrug.

Features
Monument to Sharvili, hero of the national Lezgian epic. The North Caucasus mountains surround the town.

Spa of Akhty
The Akhty spa is located to the southwest of Akhty, on the left bank of the Akhtychay River inside a gorge. The spa has three different types of mineral water: hydrogen sulfide, radon, and iodine-bromine. The temperature of the source varies from 38-40 °C to 65-68 °C. Its temperature fluctuates depending on the season. Spa resort "Akhty" is located here.

Climate
Akhty has a warm-summer humid continental climate (Köppen climate classification: Dfb) with moderately warm and humid summers and cold, dry winters. Sunshine is plentiful year-round.

References

Rural localities in Akhtynsky District